Paragoniaeola is a genus of picture-winged flies in the family Ulidiidae.

Species
 P. tanycephala

References

Ulidiidae